Al Husayn or Al husayn may refer to:

Husayn ibn Ali
Al husayn, Yemen